Smoky Mountain Wrestling was a professional wrestling promotion that held events in the Appalachian area of the United States from October 1991 to December 1995, when it was run by Jim Cornette. The promotion was based in Knoxville, Tennessee, with offices in Morristown, Tennessee.

History and overview

Formation
Cornette formed the promotion in October 1991 upon leaving World Championship Wrestling, with Sandy Scott and backed financially by music producer Rick Rubin. The first events and TV tapings were held in October and November 1991. Matches from these shows were first shown in February 1992. The first Smoky Mountain Heavyweight Champion, "Primetime" Brian Lee, won the championship in a tournament held at Volunteer Slam on May 22, 1992, in Knoxville, Tennessee. The first Smoky Mountain Tag Team Champions were crowned in a tournament final at a TV taping on April 23, 1992, in Harrogate, Tennessee, when The Heavenly Bodies defeated The Fantastics; the match would air on May 9, 1992.

Territorial reach
Cornette had initially envisioned a territory reaching from Kentucky into as far as South Carolina and Georgia. Though they did eventually run events over that large of a region, including a few shows at the Cobb County Civic Center in Marietta, Georgia, the promotion's biggest towns included Knoxville, Tennessee, and Johnson City, Tennessee. SMW event tours also included high school gyms and fairs in cities throughout Tennessee, Kentucky, West Virginia, Virginia, and North Carolina.

In 1993, Smoky Mountain Wrestling signed deals with World Championship Wrestling and the World Wrestling Federation to showcase their wrestlers on the larger companies' shows. This led to The Rock 'n' Roll Express wrestling The Heavenly Bodies (Tom Prichard and Stan Lane) at SuperBrawl III in February 1993. The Heavenly Bodies (Prichard and Jimmy Del Ray) then faced The Steiner Brothers for the WWF Tag Team Championship at SummerSlam 1993, and then defeating The Rock 'n' Roll Express at Survivor Series 1993 for the SMW Tag Team Championship.

Notable talent
The promotion featured a number of wrestlers who were regulars in the Southeastern wrestling scene the Heavenly Bodies, Stan Lane and Tom Prichard and later Prichard and Jimmy Del Ray. The Heavenly Bodies, managed by Jim Cornette, were featured heavily throughout the years as they worked storyline feuds with The Rock 'n' Roll Express, The Fantastics and The Armstrong Family (especially Bob Armstrong) SMW also featured a number of younger wrestlers who had not yet made their mark on a national stage, including Bob Holly, New Jack, Al Snow, Balls Mahoney, Chris Jericho, Glenn Jacobs (then known as Unabomb, later better known under the ring name Kane), Lance Storm, Chris Candido, Tammy Lynn Sytch, Brian Girard James (B.G. James / Road Dogg) and D'Lo Brown, but ultimately, like most independents, was not financially successful. Cornette eventually signed a working agreement with the World Wrestling Federation to trade talent, manage and serve as an on-air talent for that company.

Brian Hildebrand was a Smoky Mountain mainstay, occupying such myriad roles as Head of Merchandise, referee (under his alter ego Mark Curtis) and sound director.

Style and controversy
Cornette, a traditionalist, catered to fans that Mick Foley described as "old-time fans...who still believed in good guys and bad guys, and to whom cheating was still reason to get upset." Bob Caudle, who was the play-by-play announcer on the TV program, would also proclaim at the beginning of each show that Smoky Mountain Wrestling was "professional wrestling the way it used to be, and the way you like it." This was in sharp contrast to ECW, in which edgy angles, "tweeners" and anti-heroes increasingly took precedence over clearcut heroes and villains. Smoky Mountain was, however, the birthplace of the controversial "Gangstas" gimmick, where black wrestlers New Jack and Mustafa would cut promos about activist Medgar Evers,  while also using fried chicken and watermelon as props. The gimmick, among other things, led to the end of the friendship between Cornette and Mark Madden and their ongoing feud to this day, as Madden--who at the time was coming off the heels of getting Bill Watts fired from WCW after informing Hank Aaron of Watts' employment within the Turner Broadcasting System following publications of controversial comments made by Watts--had called the Gangstas gimmick racist.

National Wrestling Alliance
The promotion had a brief association with the National Wrestling Alliance (NWA), whose flagship promotion Eastern Championship Wrestling had split away in August 1994, leaving the NWA with no World Heavyweight Champion. A 10-man tournament was held in Cherry Hill, New Jersey in November, featuring many SMW wrestlers; the participants were Tracy Smothers, Devon Storm, Eddie Gilbert, Johnny Gunn, Chris Candido, Al Snow, Dirty White Boy, Jerry Lawler, Lou Perez, and Osamu Nishimura. The winner was Chris Candido, who defended his title mostly at SMW events. In February 1995, however, Candido lost the belt to Ultimate Fighting Championship winner Dan Severn, who as a freelancer decided to become a traveling World Champion, depriving SMW of a basis for World Heavyweight championship matches. However in April 1995, The Rock 'n' Roll Express won the NWA World Tag Team Championship for the fifth time, giving SMW a handful of World Tag Team championship matches.

Demise
Though the promotion was highly thought of, it struggled to get a profitable television deal, and operated throughout a wrestling recession that would not end until the second half of 1996. After years of operating in red ink, and the loss of financial backing from Rubin, Cornette shut the promotion down in December 1995 to work full-time with the WWF. The last SMW show was held on November 26, 1995 in Cookeville, Tennessee (though it had been announced on SMW TV's November 25, 1995 episode that upcoming shows were to be held at the Collett Street Rec Center in Morganton, North Carolina on December 1, 1995, and at Cloudland High School in Roan Mountain, Tennessee the following night), and featured the entire SMW roster attacking Jim Cornette, who was then pinned by referee Mark Curtis. Several SMW wrestlers would soon obtain work in the WWF, including Tracy Smothers, The Dirty White Boy, and Boo Bradley. WWE now owns the SMW video library.

Both Curtis Comes Home and the 2005 sequel show, held in memory of SMW head referee Mark Curtis are considered "unofficial" reunion shows.

Former personnel

Major events

1992

NOTE: the Thanksgiving Thunder series of matches between The Rock 'n Roll Express and The Heavenly Bodies each were contested under different rules. The first match was a falls count anywhere match, the second a Texas death match, the third a street fight, and the last a barbed wire steel cage match. The team listed last for those matches was defending the SMW Tag Team Championship that particular night.

1993

1994

1995

NOTE: the Halloween Scream series of matches between Buddy Landel and Tommy Rich each were contested under different rules. The first match was a Tennessee Chain match, the second a Falls Count Anywhere match, the third a First Blood match, and the last a Barbed Wire match. The Knoxville, Cookeville and Johnson City shows of the same tour also had special "Treat or Treat" tag team matches with Brad Armstrong and The Wolfman against Terry Gordy and Headbanger Thrasher. The stipulations included throwing money into the crowd (if Wolfman loses the fall), Gordy and Thrasher's heads shaved bald (if Thrasher loses the fall), ten lashes with a leather strap (if Gordy loses the fall), and the SMW Heavyweight Championship (if Armstrong loses the fall). After Gordy pinned Armstrong to win the SMW title in Knoxville, the stipulations to both Gordy and Armstrong were switched.

Tournaments
Smoky Mountain Wrestling held a variety of professional wrestling tournaments between 1992 and 1995 that were competed for by wrestlers that were a part of their roster.

SMW Tag Team Championship Tournament
The SMW Tag Team Championship Tournament was a tournament to crown the first-ever SMW Tag Team Champions. It was held between March 12 and April 23, 1992; the finals of the tournament was originally scheduled for Volunteer Slam on May 22 in Knoxville, but the teams that made the finals, The Fantastics and The Heavenly Bodies, decided to have the tournament final on the April 23, 1992 TV taping, which aired on May 9.

SMW Heavyweight Championship Tournament

King of Kentucky Tournament
The King of Kentucky Tournament was a one-night single elimination tournament held in Hazard, Kentucky on June 24, 1993.

NWA World Heavyweight Championship Tournament (1994)
The NWA World Heavyweight Championship Tournament was a one-night single elimination tournament held in Cherry Hill, New Jersey on November 19, 1994, to decide a new NWA World Heavyweight Champion. The previous champion Shane Douglas had infamously "threw down" the NWA title in favor of the ECW World Heavyweight Championship after defeating 2 Cold Scorpio at the NWA World Title Tournament three months earlier.

Carolina Cup Tag Team Tournament
The Carolina Cup Tag Team Tournament was a one-night single elimination tournament held at the Grady Cole Center on August 13, 1995.

Final champions

† After SMW closed, Brad Armstrong declared himself SMW champion and defended the SMW Heavyweight Championship in the United States Wrestling Association. He eventually lost the belt to Jerry Lawler on December 30, 1995.

See also

List of independent wrestling promotions in the United States

References

External links
 Kayfabe Memories
 The History of Smokey Mountain Wrestling

 
Independent professional wrestling promotions based in Tennessee
Entertainment companies established in 1991
Companies disestablished in 1995
Companies based in Knoxville, Tennessee
1991 establishments in Tennessee
WWE